Edward Henry Lee, 1st Earl of Lichfield (4 February 1663 – 14 July 1716) was an English peer, the son of a baronet, who at 14 years of age married one of the illegitimate daughters of King Charles II, Charlotte Lee, prior to which he was made Earl of Lichfield. They had a large family; Lady Lichfield bore him 18 children. He was a staunch Tory and followed James II to Rochester, Kent after the king's escape from Whitehall in December 1688. His subsidiary titles were Viscount Quarendon and Baron Spelsbury.

Biography

Early life
Edward Lee was the son of Sir Francis Henry Lee, 4th Baronet of Quarendon and his wife Lady Elizabeth Pope, daughter of Thomas Pope, 2nd Earl of Downe, who was later third wife of Robert Bertie, 3rd Earl of Lindsey. His great grandfather, Henry Lee, was the cousin and heir of Henry Lee of Ditchley. His father's half-brother was the libertine-poet the Earl of Rochester

In his youth, he was considered to be kind, charming, strong, intelligent as well as arrogant because of his position in the peerage. 

.

Marriage

Lee was created Earl of Lichfield in 1674 at the age of eleven, a result of his betrothal to the daughter of King Charles II. The Lady Charlotte Fitzroy was the fourth of six children born to the king's mistress, the Duchess of Cleveland. Sweet-natured and strikingly beautiful, Charlotte was adored by her father the king. She was contracted at the age of nine to Lee, who was sixteen months older than his bride-to-be. Nearly three years later, having reached puberty, the thirteen- and fourteen-year-olds were married on 6 February 1677.

Public service
From 1687 to 1689, Lichfield served as Lord Lieutenant of Oxfordshire. He commanded Lichfield's Regiment, an infantry regiment in the English Army until his dismissal for Jacobite sympathies following the Glorious Revolution. It later played prominent part in the Williamite War in Ireland (1689–1691), going through a succession of new Colonels including Henry Wharton and Richard Brewer.

Family and children
Lady Lichfield bore him at least eighteen children: 
 Charlotte Lee, Lady Baltimore (13 March 1678 (Old Style) – 22 January 1721), 
 (1) Benedict Calvert, 4th Baron Baltimore, by whom she had six children.
 (2) Christopher Crowe, Consul of Leghorn, by whom she had four children.
 Charles Lee, Viscount Quarendon (6 May 1680 – 13 October 1680).
 Lieutenant-Colonel Edward Henry Lee, Viscount Quarendon (6 June 1681 – 21 October 1713), a captain in the Colstream Guards
 Captain Hon. James Lee (13 November 1682 – 1711).
 Francis Lee (14 February 1685)
 Anne Lee (29 June 1686 – d. 1716?), married N Morgan
 Charles Lee (5 June 1688 – 3 January 1708).
 George Henry Lee, 2nd Earl of Lichfield (12 March 1690 – 15 February 1743).
 Francis Henry Fitzroy Lee (10 September 1692 – died 1730).
 Elizabeth Lee (26 May 1693 – 29 January 1741). Married:
 (1) Francis Lee, a cousin. Had one son and two daughters, the eldest of whom, Elisabeth (d. 1736 at Lyon) married Henry Temple, son of the 1st Viscount Palmerston.
 (2) Edward Young, in 1731, author of the Night Thoughts, by whom she had one son. It is said that he never recovered from Elizabeth's death.
 Barbara Lee (3 March 1695 – d. aft. 1729), married Sir George Browne, 3rd Baronet of Kiddington.
 Mary Isabella Lee (6 September 1697 – 28 December 1697).
 Fitzroy Lee (10 May 1698 – died young).
 Vice Admiral FitzRoy Henry Lee (2 January 1700 – April 1751), Commodore Governor of Newfoundland.
 William Lee (24 June 1701 – died young).
 Thomas Lee (25 August 1703 – died young).
 John Lee (3 December 1704 – died young).
 Robert Lee, 4th Earl of Lichfield (3 July 1706 – 3 November 1776).

Death and legacy
Lichfield died two years before his wife, on 14 July 1716, aged 53.

Ancestry

References

1663 births
1716 deaths
17th-century English nobility
18th-century English nobility
1st Earl of Lichfield
Grenadier Guards officers
Suffolk Regiment officers
Lord-Lieutenants of Oxfordshire